Charlie Beckett  (born 3 November 1995) is an English rugby union player for Ampthill in the RFU Championship.

Originally part of Leicester Tigers academy, he made the switch to Gloucester academy where he captained Gloucester United in the 'A' League competition. He was also dual-registered with London Welsh and Hartpury College in lower league competitions for professional development.

He represented England U18s back in the 2014-15 season. He was also named in the England U20s for the 2015 Six Nations Under 20s Championship and for the 2015 World Rugby Under 20 Championship.

On 2 May 2018, Beckett signed a two year professional contract with RFU Championship side Jersey Reds from the 2018-19 season. On 19 August 2020, Beckett left Jersey with immediate effect because the English Championship for the 2019-20 season stopped due to the coronavirus pandemic, he re-signed with old club Gloucester on a short-term deal for the remainder of the season.

He signed for Ampthill ahead of the 2020–21 season.

References

External links
ESPN Profile
Its Rugby Profile
Ultimate Rugby Profile

1995 births
Living people
English rugby union players
Gloucester Rugby players
Leicester Tigers players
Rugby union players from Liverpool
Ampthill RUFC players
Rugby union flankers